John F. Byrne (born May 27, 1935) is an American politician from Pennsylvania who served as a Democratic member of the Pennsylvania State Senate for the 6th district from 1967 to 1970.  He is the son of John F. Byrne Sr., who also served in the state senate and on the Philadelphia City Council.

Early life and education
Byrne was born in Philadelphia, Pennsylvania and graduated from the University of Pennsylvania.

References

Politicians from Philadelphia
Democratic Party Pennsylvania state senators
Living people
1935 births
20th-century American politicians
University of Pennsylvania alumni